The 2019–20 North Carolina A&T Aggies men's basketball team represent North Carolina Agricultural and Technical State University in the 2019–20 NCAA Division I men's basketball season. The Aggies, led by 4th-year head coach Jay Joyner, play their home games at the Corbett Sports Center in Greensboro, North Carolina as members of the Mid-Eastern Athletic Conference.

Previous season
The Aggies finished the 2018–19 season 19–13 overall, 13–3 in MEAC play, finishing in 2nd place. In the MEAC tournament, they defeated Coppin State in the quarterfinals, before falling to North Carolina Central in the semifinals.

Roster

Schedule and results

|-
!colspan=12 style=| Non-conference regular season

|-
!colspan=9 style=| MEAC regular season

|-
!colspan=12 style=| MEAC tournament
|-

|-

Source

References

North Carolina A&T Aggies men's basketball seasons
North Carolina AandT Aggies
North Carolina AandT Aggies men's basketball
North Carolina AandT Aggies men's basketball